The Edmund White Award is an annual literary award, presented by Publishing Triangle to honour debut novels by writers within the LGBT community. First presented in 2006, the award was named in honour of American novelist Edmund White.

Winners
 2006 — Mack Friedman, Setting the Lawn on Fire
 2007 — Martin Hyatt, A Scarecrow's Bible
 2008 — Myriam Gurba, Dahlia Season
 2009 — Evan Fallenberg, Light Fell
 2010 — Lori Ostlund, The Bigness of the World
 2011 — Katharine Beutner, Alcestis
 2012 — Lara Fergus, My Sister Chaos
 2013 — Lysley Tenorio, Monstress
 2014 — Sara Farizan, If You Could Be Mine
 2015 — Kim Fu, For Today I Am a Boy
 2016 — Carellin Brooks, One Hundred Days of Rain
 2017 — Joe Okonkwo, Jazz Moon
 2018 — SJ Sindu, Marriage of a Thousand Lies
 2019 — Joseph Cassara, The House of Impossible Beauties
 2020 — Téa Mutonji, Shut Up You're Pretty
 2021 — Julia Serano, 99 Erics: A Kat Cataclysm Faux Novel
 2022 — Robert Jones Jr., The Prophets

References

External links
 

Triangle Awards
American fiction awards
Awards established in 2006
First book awards
LGBT literary awards